CBS 5 may refer to one of the following television stations in the United States:

Current affiliates
KALB-DT2, a digital channel of KALB-TV in Alexandria, Louisiana
KAUU in Anchorage, Alaska
KCTV in Kansas City, Missouri
KENS in San Antonio, Texas
KFSM-TV in Fort Smith, Arkansas
KGMB in Honolulu, Hawaii
KGWN-TV in Cheyenne, Wyoming
KION-TV in Monterey, California (cable channel; broadcasts on channel 46)
KPHO-TV in Phoenix, Arizona
KPIX-TV in San Francisco, California (O&O)
KREX-TV in Grand Junction, Colorado
KXGN-TV in Glendive, Montana
WABI-TV in Bangor, Maine
WCSC-TV in Charleston, South Carolina
WDTV in Weston, West Virginia
WFRV-TV in Green Bay, Wisconsin
WKRG-TV in Mobile, Alabama
WNEM-TV in Saginaw, Michigan
WTVF in Nashville, Tennessee
WTVH in Syracuse, New York

Formerly affiliated
KSL-TV in Salt Lake City, Utah (1949 to 1995)
WAGA-TV in Atlanta, Georgia (1949 to 1994)
WEWS-TV in Cleveland, Ohio (1947 to 1956)
WOI-TV in Ames/Des Moines, Iowa (1950 to 1955)
WRAL-TV in Raleigh, North Carolina (1985 to 2016)